(sometimes also known as ) is an Indonesian term for the activity where migrants or migrant workers return to their hometown or village during or before major holidays, especially Lebaran (Eid al-Fitr).  stands for  ( 'Coming Home') which comes from the Javanese language. Although the  homecoming travel before Lebaran takes place in most Indonesian urban centers, the highlight is on the nation's largest urban agglomeration; Greater Jakarta, as millions of Jakartans exit the city by various means of transportation, overwhelming train stations and airports and also clogging highways, especially the Trans-Java toll road and Java's Northern Coast Road.

The primary motivation of this homecoming tradition is to visit one's family, especially parents. However, people might seek to come to their hometown during this period to attend a rare opportunity: a gathering of members of the extended family, the seldom seen relatives that are normally scattered in other cities, other provinces or even overseas.

 for Eid al-Fitr, or its similar traditions, exists in countries with Muslim majorities, such as Indonesia,  Malaysia, and Pakistan. Other similar annual homecoming traditions are also observable in various parts of the world, including Chinese New Year in China and Chinese overseas, Thai Songkran, Christmas in Europe, Divali in India and Thanksgiving in America, where family members are expected to come home during these specific holidays.

Etymology 

Pulang kampung, meanwhile, simply means "returning home" (a connotation of kampung, which literally means village).

History 
The tradition to visit one's hometown, home village or family ancestral home is not a new tradition in Indonesian history. Manuscripts dated from the Majapahit period describes that nobles and royals often returned from the capital city in Trowulan to their ancestral home in order to honor and appease ancestral spirits. In Balinese tradition, Hindu Balinese people came home to their hometowns or their home villages during Galungan and Kuningan sacred days, as they believed it marks the time when the ancestral spirits visit their descendants in the mortal world.

In most parts of Indonesia where Islam is the majority, the homecoming or  tradition is most often conducted in the month of Ramadhan, between a week to several days prior to Lebaran (Eid al-Fitr). Nevertheless, other ethnicities such as the Madurese are known to conduct their  tradition prior to Eid al-Adha instead. Indonesian Christians, on the other hand, especially Batak people, might travel to their hometown prior to Christmas.

The term  to coin the specific homecoming activity, started to enter common Indonesians' vocabulary since the 1970s. It is suggested that in 1970s, during the start of Suharto's centralized New Order regime, the prominence of Jakarta as the center of the nation's politics, administrative and economic activities prompted massive urbanization, where the population of rural Javanese villages flocked and migrated to Jakarta and surrounding areas (Greater Jakarta) seeking jobs and economic opportunities. The majority of the migrants came from rural Javanese areas; nevertheless, Jakarta also attracted migrants from all over Indonesia. These newcomer migrants, that still nurture their links to their hometowns in rural Java or other corners in Indonesia, were actively involved in the annual mudik travel.

Outside of Java, Mudik homecoming is also significantly observable in Sumatra, especially in West Sumatra, Riau, Jambi, South Sumatra corridors, where numbers of migrant workers, especially Minang  (migrant) return to their hometown to celebrate Idul Fitri.

To prevent the spread of COVID-19, the Indonesian government discouraged people from performing the mudik journey in April and May 2020.

Scale 
As there are large numbers of travelers who perform , the government of Indonesia provides additional transportation to handle the resulting massive travel surge in several days prior to and after the Lebaran. In 2013, around 30 million people traveled to their hometowns during Lebaran. They spent a total sum of around 90 trillion rupiah (around US$9 billion) in rural areas. In 2017 it was estimated that the people that took annual mudik travel reached 33 million people. This causes massive traffic jams and a sudden rise of demand and volume of intercity transportation.

Impacts

Transportation 

The demand for train and airplane tickets usually spikes a month or two prior to Lebaran, prompting an unusually higher cost for tickets for highly sought days of departure. Some airlines might add extra flights or operate larger airplanes to deal with the surge in demand. Indonesian train operator Kereta Api Indonesia usually offers additional train trips or introduces longer trains with more cars in order to meet the demand. The private operators of intercity and inter-province buses usually charge higher ticket costs during this period.

The heaviest burdens faced during  are congestion and travel delays on public transport or the existing road network.

The impact is indeed tremendous as millions of buses, cars and motorcycles jam the roads and highways, causing kilometer-long traffic jams each year. The massive congestion usually occurs along Trans-Java toll road and Java's Northern Coast Road. 

Various modes of transportation such as motorcycles are used by  travelers to reach their hometowns. Although it might be done for short range of travel, the police and authorities have discouraged this practice, citing the motorcycle's potential danger and unsuitability for mid- to long-range  travel. Large numbers of  accidents involve motorcyclists. Thus, to reduce usage of motorcycles, the government tried to lure motorcyclists away from  travel by offering , or free  program. The program offers motorcyclists a free service to send their motorcycles via railways, trucks or ships to their towns separately, while they travel with another mode of transportation instead. Despite initial success in reducing  motorcyclists in 2014 and 2015, the number of  motorcyclists spiked in 2016 to 5.6 million motorcycles.

Business 
The sudden exodus of large numbers of migrant workers — most of them unskilled labor such as domestic helpers, and those who work in service sectors — has created a void in Jakarta and other major cities' daily activities, as numbers of business, services, establishments, warung and restaurants are closed for Lebaran. The sudden loss of occupants after  is also observable on relatively empty Jakarta streets during Lebaran, which normally suffers from clogged traffic. Additionally, the wealthier classes — who do not participate in mudik travel —  often go to local hotels or overseas to accommodate the absence of their domestic servants, drivers, and even security guards.

See also

 Balik kampung in Malaysia
 Chunyun in China

References

External links 
  Mudik culture followed by urbanization culture

Indonesian culture
Seasonal traditions
Holidays
Migrant workers